AloPeyk is an on-demand delivery company based in Iran. It was founded in September 2016 by Mehdi Nayebi and Mehrshad Pezeshk who both moved from Europe to Tehran to start the company. Nayebi wanted to offer a solution for Iranian ecommerce companies looking to outsource deliveries and logistics. By 2017, the company was reported to deliver 10,000 packages per day. That same year, Apple had removed the AloPeyk app from its App Store in compliance with U.S. sanctions against Iran. By 2021, the company reportedly had shipped 75 million packages since its founding, and had 15,000 active daily drivers on its platform.

The company gained its initial market share by offering lower prices than its competitors. On the back-end, the company uses algorithms and computer software to reduce the idle time of its delivery drivers, and allow them to make more deliveries at a lower cost to the end customer. In 2018, the Financial Times reported that AloPeyk had hired 50,000 motorcycle couriers and 10,000 van drivers since its founding.

To fund its expansion, the company received investments in 2019 from Turquoise Partners and other firms.

Mobile app 
The AloPeyk app allows users to choose their preferred delivery date and time, plan returns, automate billing documents, and choose from several payments methods. The company also offers an API to automate bulk requests.

See also 
Snapp!
Technology start-ups in Iran
Package delivery

References 

Sharing economy
Science and technology in Iran